is a 2006 Japanese crossover fighting game for the GameCube and PlayStation 2. The "D.O.N." in the game's title is derived from Dragon Ball Z, One Piece, and Naruto, the three manga series published by Weekly Shōnen Jump upon which the game is based. Both versions of the game received a rating of 26 out of 40 from Weekly Famitsu.

Gameplay
Battle Stadium D.O.N. is a platform fighter, in which up to four players battle on one of 11 dynamic stages in battles based around free-roaming two-dimensional character movement. Unlike other fighting games, D.O.N uses a "tug-of-war" fighting system. Attacking opponents will knock glowing orbs out of them for players to collect, with a bar at the top of the screen indicating what percentage of the orbs in play each character possesses; the size and value of these orbs vary depending on the strength of the attack used. Players who collect a majority of the orbs will enter "burst mode", dramatically increasing their speed and attack power. To win a fight, a player must either collect all of the orbs in play, leaving their opponents with none, or possess the highest percentage of orbs when time runs out. As such, a fight can potentially last indefinitely if no time limit is set. Characters have access to a host of special moves and abilities, with certain characters being able to use temporary transformations to increase their strength. Items will also spawn during battle, which can be used to attack opponents or induce positive and negative status effects.

The single player mode has the player fight through five rounds, some of which have missions with randomly selected goals; the higher the difficulty chosen by the player, the more missions are given out. Fulfilling these missions' goals rewards the player with coins that can be used in a slot machine upon defeating the boss character, allowing players to potentially unlock characters, stages, and other bonuses.

Up to four players can participate in a multi-player session, though a multitap must be used for more than two players for the PS2 version.

Playable characters
The game features a total of 20 playable characters, 12 of which are available from the start.

References

External links
 
Battle Stadium D.O.N. review
Nintendo's Official Website 

2006 video games
Crossover fighting games
Dragon Ball games
GameCube games
Japan-exclusive video games
Multiplayer and single-player video games
Naruto video games
One Piece games
Platform fighters
PlayStation 2 games
Q Entertainment games
Fighting games
Video games developed in Japan
Video games scored by Hitoshi Sakimoto
Video games scored by Manabu Namiki
Video games scored by Masaharu Iwata
Video games with cel-shaded animation
Eighting games